Korean may refer to:

People and culture
 Koreans, ethnic group originating in the Korean Peninsula
 Korean cuisine
 Korean culture
 Korean language
Korean alphabet, known as Hangul or Chosŏn'gŭl
Korean dialects and the Jeju language
See also: North–South differences in the Korean language

Places
 Korean Peninsula, a peninsula in East Asia
 Korea, a region of East Asia
 North Korea, the Democratic People's Republic of Korea
 South Korea, the Republic of Korea

Other uses
Korean Air, flag carrier and the largest airline of South Korea

See also
Korean War, 1950–1953 war between North Korea and South Korea
Names of Korea, various country names used in international contexts
History of Korea, the history of Korea up to 1945

Language and nationality disambiguation pages